Nawab Sayyid Hussain Ali Khan Barha (1666 – 8 October 1720), officially Ihtisham-ul-Mulk, was a kingmaker of the later Mughal Period. Best known for ordering the death of the Emperor Farrukhsiyar largely in attempt to halt the numerous assaination attempts that the latter had ordered against him and his brother Abdullah Khan Barha. Hussain Ali Khan rose as a kingmaker in early 18th century India, when he was also the ruler of Aurangabad, ruler of Ajmer by proxy and Subahdar of the Deccan

Both Hussain Ali Khan and his brother, Abdullah Khan II, had a hand in the installation or deposition (or both installation and deposition) of several emperors to the throne at Delhi, including: Bahadur Shah I, Jahandar Shah, Furrukhsiyar, Rafi ud Darajat, Shah Jahan II, Ibrahim and Muhammad Shah. and eventually became de facto rulers of the sub-continent by the early 18th century, at a time when India's economy was the largest in the world.

Early life and family 
Barha was the second son of the Nawab of Ajmer, Sayyid Mian Abdullah Khan I. They claim to be descendants of the fourth Rashidun Caliph, Ali, and after migrating in ancient times to India, the family quickly became established as nobles of the sword a status they held under various empires, notably including the Delhi Sultanate and later the Sur Empire. The claims of such ancestry are not accepted, instead they are described as descendants of peasants from Punjab. Under the Mughals the family was firmly regarded as old nobility and by the reign of Aurangzeb they held the prestige of being Nawabs of Ajmer or Dakhin, premier realms typically reserved for princes of blood. The Sadaat-e-Bara tribe, due to their reputation, acquired a hereditary right to lead the vanguard of imperial Mughal armies in every battle. The Mughal emperor Jahangir remarked that the Sadaat-e-Bara were "averters of calamity from this dominion".

He started his early career as a Faujdar under Aurangzeb's reign and eventually gained higher positions after backing Bahadur Shah I in the succession war ensuing Aurangzeb's death.

Biography 
Hussain Ali Khan served as the Commander-in-chief and Mir Bakhsi of the Mughal Empire(the premier general and defence minister of the empire, with powers often extending beyond the war office) the Sipahsalar, and the Amir-ul-Umara(chief of all nobles)
, and personally oversaw the end of Ajit Singh's rebellion. He was appointed the Viceroy of the six provinces of the Deccan, after which he broke the peace agreements with the Marathas and engaged in open warfare with all the Maratha chieftains without discrimination. He was inclined to use of exaggerated and insolent language, and flatterers in the camp of Hussain Ali Khan used to recite the verses, even in the Emperor's presence 
"The whole world and all creation seeks the shelter of your umbrella, 
Kings of the world earn crowns through your emprize." He is noted by William Irvine to have been "Really friendly to the poor and non-oppressive in disposition." During his time as the ruler of Aurangabad, Barha began a reservoir, a bridge and other works for the public.

Death 
He was eventually assassinated by Turkish nobles also known as the Turani faction. On the pretext of presenting a petition concerning his malnourished troops, Haider Beg Dughlat fatally stabbed Hussain Ali Khan as his attention was diverted to reading the petition. Haider Beg Dughlat was immediately killed by Hussain Ali Khan's fourteen year old nephew Sayyid Nurallah Khan (Sayyid Nur Ali) who was himself immediately killed by Mughal troops. According to the historian Khizr Khan, Hussain Ali Khan was buried in his fathers tomb at Ajmer.

Titles 
Upon helping the Emperor Farrukhsiyar to the throne of Delhi, Hussain Ali Khan Barha was awarded with the position of Mir Bakshi and granted the following titles and appellations: Umdat-ul-mulk, Amir-ul-Umara, Bahadur, Feroze Jung, Sipah Sardar.

Depictions

References 

1666 births
1720 deaths
History of the Mughal Empire